Monadenia infumata, the redwood sideband snail, is a species of land snail found on the Pacific coast of the United States. 

Subspecies
 Monadenia infumata callidina S.S. Berry, 1940
 Monadenia infumata infumata (A. Gould, 1855)
 Monadenia infumata trinidadensis Talmadge, 1947

 Monadenia infumata alamedensis S. S. Berry, 1940: synonym of Monadenia infumata infumata (A. Gould, 1855)
 Monadenia infumata ochromphalus S.S. Berry, 1937: synonym of Monadenia ochromphalus S. S. Berry, 1937
 Monadenia infumata setosa Talmadge, 1952: synonym of Monadenia setosa Talmadge, 1952
 Monadenia infumata subcarinata (Hemphill in W.G. Binney, 1892): synonym of Monadenia subcarinata (Hemphill in W.G. Binney, 1892)

References

External links
 Gould, A. A. (1855). New species of land and fresh-water shells from Western (N.) America. Proceedings of the Boston Society of Natural History. 5: 127-130
 Sullivan, R.M. (2021). Phylogenetic relationships among subclades within the Trinity bristle snail species complex, riverine barriers, and re-classification. California Fish and Wildlife. Special CESA Issue: 107-145

Endemic fauna of the Pacific Northwest
Gastropods described in 1855
infumata